The Pierre Mendès-France (aka Tolbiac) centre of University of Paris 1 Pantheon-Sorbonne, which hosts undergraduate lectures, is regularly blocked by students in order to protest reforms of the government. Lectures are then cancelled, up to several months.

1995 blockades
There were blockades in 1995.

1997 blockades
Tolbiac center has been occupied by 200 protesters for one month after a reform in 1997.

2006 blockades
After some small fights, lectures have been cancelled and Tolbiac occupied in 2006.

2007-09 blockades
During the 2007–09 university protests in France, Tolbiac center of Paris 1 has been multiple times occupied by 75 to 200 far-left or left activist and courses have been cancelled to prevent further occupations. Violence  been spotted: some doors of the university have been cut with jig-saws, people have been pressed against grids and slapped, those wearing kippas insulted for being Jew.

2010 blockades
Tolbiac has been blocked in 2010, after a reform and to pay tribute to students who have blocked Tolbiac in 1995 and 2006.

2018 blockades

In 2018, Tolbiac centre was occupied for one month. Among some students' many demands were:

 the revocation of the Plan Etudiants , or its non-application by Panthéon-Sorbonne. The Plan Etudiants is a vast reform of French public education aiming to increase selectiveness and inter-university competition. The most controversial aspects of it were the weakening of the right to a higher education guaranteed to all high-schoolers upon completion of secondary education, the biased criteria of selection (geographical discrimination, students with handicaps not taken into account etc.), the incentives to privatize some aspects of public universities, or the increased possibility for universities to control their students' scholarships (scholarships are based on social criteria and controlled by the state in France)
 the resignation of the president of France Emmanuel Macron;
 the Republic's recognition of Kurdistan's statehood;
 an automatic pass mark for all students of Pantheon-Sorbonne.

Violence militants were spotted and Molotov cocktails found. An MP came to Tolbiac to discuss with the occupants but toilet paper and tomato juice were thrown on him by the occupants. Some occupants gave a press conference from inside the building, with a dog on the press table and with a setting which was mocked over the internet. A parodic Twitter account of the dog speaker was set out and received nearly 30 000 followers; it was called a "satire of (leftist) militantism".

Some professors of history and other social sciences of Pantheon-Sorbonne approved of the occupation. However, the president of the university Georges Haddad denounced a capharnaum of violence, drug, sex and rave parties in the occupied Tolbiac center and asked the police to remove the occupants. The police first refused to do it and Macron explained that decision in a TV interview by referring to the topography of the Tolbiac centre. The police finally broke in in the early morning, while the occupants were sleeping. The police found new Molotov cocktails. The students had heavily vandalized the recently refurbished center; the cost of the damages was declared to be 800,000 euros (approximately 0.38% of the university's yearly budget). Haddad decided to file a criminal complaint.

Tolbiac center was briefly blocked in October 2018, one student having been injured.

2020 

In March 2020, a group of students tried to block the center and a general vote led to clashes.

References

Student protests in France
1990s in Paris
2000s in Paris
2010s in Paris

fr:Centre Pierre-Mendès-France#Mouvements sociaux